Tern Island can also refer to:

 Tern Island (Hawaii), the main island in the atoll of French Frigate Shoals, in the Northwestern Hawaiian Islands
 Tern Island (Nunavut), Canada
 Tern Island (Queensland), Australia
 Tern Island, South Georgia
 Tern Island Natural Area, a protected area of Bent County, Colorado, USA
 Tern Island in Pleasant Bay, Cape Cod, Massachusetts